World's Finest Chocolate is a chocolate company based in Chicago, Illinois. The company pioneered product fundraising in the 1940s and today is one of the largest fundraising organizations in the United States.

History

World's Finest Chocolate was founded under the name Cook Chocolate Company by Edmond Opler Sr. in around 1939.  

He started the division that produced chocolate bars for fundraising in 1949, and called it "World's Finest Chocolate". The first customer using the company's products for fundraising was a high school from the outskirts of Chicago called Zion High School. 

In 1972, the company's name was changed to "World's Finest Chocolate". In 1985, the company moved into its 500,000-square-foot factory on South Lawndale Avenue. Opler's son, Edmond Jr., has run the company since Edmond Sr. retired in 1988. 

In 2006 World's Finest Chocolate acquired Queen Anne, a brand of cordial cherries. In 2011, the company produced a 12,000 pound chocolate bar and thereby broke the previous 9,700 pound world record for the largest chocolate bar. In June 2015, the company acquired Market Day, a frozen food store.

In 2021, World’s Finest Chocolate started a monthly $2K Giveaway for Outstanding Educators, in which customers could vote for educators on the company's Facebook page. The online contest ran monthly until May 2022. In the same year, the company also launched an initiative to donate 10 million chocolate bars to COVID-19 frontline workers.

Corporate affairs 
The company manufactures chocolate "from bean to bar", and sources cocoa beans from their own cocoa farm in St. Lucia, an island country in the West Indies and has a production site in South Chicago. Today the company's products are sold exclusively to help organizations raise funds. The company has a sales team that helps schools and other organizations to set up and run fundraising campaigns and projects, working largely with schools.

Products 
The core of the company's business is bulk sales of chocolate bars for school fundraisers and corporate gifts. 

The company offers different product cases, e.g. a 60-count $1 case and a 30-count $2 case. The revenue of the sales is split 50/50 with the fundraising organizations. World's Finest Chocolate is one of the largest suppliers of this market segment and according to the company has sold more than 6 billion chocolate bars, their best-known product, and helped their customers raise more than USD 4.4 billion since 1949.

References

Further reading

External links
 

American chocolate companies
Food and drink companies based in Chicago
Food and drink companies established in 1939
Fundraising